Track racing is a form of motorcycle racing where teams or individuals race opponents around an unpaved oval track. There are differing variants, with each variant racing on a different surface type.

The most common variant is Speedway which has many professional domestic and international competitions in a number of countries.

Administered internationally by the Fédération Internationale de Motocyclisme (FIM), the sport became popular in the 1920s and remains so today.

Nature of the sport

Track racing involves between four and six, sometimes eight competitors riding around an oval track in a counter-clockwise direction over a set number of laps - usually four to six sometimes eight - with points being awarded to all but the last finisher on a sliding scale.

These points are accumulated over a number of heats, with the winner being the team or individual who has scored the most overall.

The machines used are customised motorcycles, these have no brakes and are fuelled with methanol. Speedway also uses motorcycles with no gears or rear suspension. 
The use of methanol means the engines can run high compression ratios, resulting in more power and higher speeds (approx 80 mph or 130 km/h when cornering) although the skill of Track Racing lies in the overall ability of the rider to control their motorcycle when cornering and thus avoid losing places through deceleration.

This has resulted in powersliding or broadsiding being used as a technique in most variants of the sport to progress around the track.

Track characteristics
Competitions take place on tracks which are defined by the FIM as being of the following:

Speedway - a track with a top surface in granite, shale, brick granules or similar unbound material rolled in on the base ground 
Longtrack -  sand, shale or similar unbound material rolled in on the base ground 
Grasstrack - firm, level turf with minor undulations 
Ice Speedway - ice with a minimum thickness of 10 cm

Variants of the sport

Speedway

Speedway racing takes place on a flat oval track measuring between 260 and 425 metres long, usually consisting of dirt or loosely packed shale. Competitors use this loose surface to slide their machines sideways into the bends using the rear wheel to scrub-off speed while still providing the drive to power the bike forward and around the bend.

FIM regulations state that the motorcycles used must have no brakes, run on pure methanol, use only one gear and weigh a minimum of 78 kg. Races consist of between four and six riders competing over four to six laps.

Originating in New South Wales, Australia in the 1920s, there are now both domestic and international competitions in a number of countries including the Speedway World Cup whilst the highest overall scoring individual in the Speedway Grand Prix events is pronounced the Speedway world champion.

Flat Track

Flat track racing looks similar to Speedway racing but is quite different. Flat track motorcycles can have either two-stroke or four-stroke engines in amateur competition. Flat track bikes have front and rear suspension, and rear brakes. The brakes are what make it completely distinct from speedway, as the brakes allow for a different cornering technique. Four-stroke motorcycles dominate professional competition and depending on the venue, can be single or multi-cylinder. Racetracks vary in length from 1/4 mile (400 metres) to 1 mile (1600 metres).

Successful riders will often move to road racing, which is considerably more lucrative. Many top American riders in Grand Prix motorcycle racing began their racing careers as flat track racers.

Grasstrack

Grasstrack racing takes place on a flat oval track usually constructed in a field. The motorcycles have two gears, rear suspension, no brakes, and are larger in length overall than speedway bikes.

Races usually take place over four laps from a standing start. Unlike Speedway, which has four riders per race, Grasstrack racing can have many riders in each heat and the circuit is normally longer, allowing higher speeds.

Grasstrack, controversially, does not have its own official FIM World Championship. Many see the World Longtrack Championship as the top championship of the sport, due to a number of rounds of the World Longtrack Championship taking place on Grasstrack circuits.

The sport does run its own European Championships. Both the European Solo Championship and European Sidecar Championship take place annually across the continent.

The current European Champions are Mathieu Tresarrieu of France (Solos) and the pairing of William Mattihjssen and Sandra Mollema of The Netherlands (Sidecars)

Longtrack

Longtrack is a variant of Grasstrack held on tracks up to 1000 – 1200 meters in length and with speeds reaching . The machinery and rules used are the same as for Grasstrack. Another difference, is that longtrack circuits are usually sand based, instead of grass.

The sport is popular in Germany, possibly more so than Speedway. This means that the majority of tracks are to be found in that country, although tracks can also be found in the Czech Republic, Finland and Norway. Occasionally, Longtrack meetings are held in Australia and the United States, but these generally take place around horse trotting arenas during their off-seasons.

The sport has two world championships, one for individuals and one for national teams, which are held annually.

World Longtrack Championship
A Grand Prix style series, held throughout the season. The rider with the most points at the end of the series is crowned World Champion.
The current champion is Romano Hummel of The Netherlands.

Longtrack of Nations
A one-off event, featuring the prominent nations of track racing: 
 Czech Republic 
 France 
 Finland 
 Germany 
 Great Britain 
 The Netherlands

The current champions are France, who won the last competition in 2019.

Ice Speedway

Ice Racing includes a motorcycle class which is the equivalent of Speedway on ice. Bikes race anti-clockwise around oval tracks between 260 and 425 metres in length. The race structure and scoring is similar to Speedway.

The sport is divided into classes for full-rubber and studded tyres. The studded tyre category involves competitors riding on bikes with inch-long spikes screwed into each tread-less tyre, each bike has 90 spikes on the front tyre and 200 on the rear (or more).

In the studded tyre class there is no broadsiding around the bends due to the grip produced by the spikes digging into the ice. Instead, riders lean their bikes into the bends at an angle where the handlebars just skim the track surface. This riding style is different from that used in the other track racing disciplines. This means riders from this discipline rarely participate in Speedway or its other variants and vice versa.

The majority of team and individual meetings are held in Russia, Sweden and Finland, but events are also held in the Czech Republic, Germany, the Netherlands, and occasionally other countries.

References

External links
Track Racing rules - Fédération Internationale de Motocyclisme
Speedway FAQ - speedway-faq.org

 
Motorcycle racing by type